The Lagny-Pomponne rail disaster occurred on 23 December 1933, between Pomponne and Lagny-sur-Marne,  east of Paris, when the 4-8-2 locomotive of the express for Strasbourg crashed at 110 km/hr (65 mph) into the rear of an auxiliary train bound for Nancy, which was stopped on the railway. The impact crushed and splintered the last five cars of the Nancy train, older wooden cars pressed into service for the holidays. Both trains were full of people going home to their families for Christmas. 204 people died and 120 were injured. It is second to the worst railway disaster in French history, after the 1917 Saint-Michel-de-Maurienne derailment, and the worst ever in peacetime.

Sources 
 2006 Documentary by  Granada Bristol for National Geographic Channel on railroad safety

Train collisions in France
Railway accidents in 1933
1933 in France
Seine-et-Marne
Transport in Île-de-France
December 1933 events
1933 disasters in France